"Delightful" is the first physical single released by Ami Suzuki under the label Avex Trax. It is commonly known as Suzuki's "comeback single", after 5 years of her previous major work.

Information
This single became her first major work of Suzuki since 2000's "Reality/Dancin' in Hip-Hop". The song "Delightful" was produced by German trance musician Axel Konrad, giving to it a marked eurodance influence. Since her return to a major company, "Delightful" was the only single to get into the Top 3 of the Oricon charts, and it has become Ami Suzuki's signature song of her new era in the Avex company. Since its release, the song has become her strong points along with "Be Together" when performing live in music festivals and public events, one of the most remarkable being the yearly Japan nationwide tour organized by Avex, A-Nation.

Chart performance
The single debuted at number two in the Oricon daily charts. At the end of its first week, it had gotten the third spot, selling 41,936. After twelve weeks in the charts, "Delightful" ended up selling 97,218 copies.

Track listing

Live performances
11 March 2005 — Music Station
17 March 2005 — Utaban
19 March 2005 — Music Fair 21 - "Delightful" and "Love the Island"
25 March 2005 — Music Fighter
26 March 2005 — CDTV
1 April 2005 — PopJam
31 December 2005 - CDTV 2005-2006 Special
31 December 2005 — 56th Kouhaku Uta Gassen

Charts
Oricon Sales Chart (Japan)

Ami Suzuki songs
2005 singles
2005 songs
Songs written by Ami Suzuki
Avex Trax singles